Escondido may refer to:

Places 
 Escondido, California, a city and valley near San Diego, United States
 Escondido Lake, in Argentina
 Escondido Valley AVA, a wine area in Texas, United States

Rivers 
 Escondido River (Coahuila), tributary of the Rio Grande in Mexico
 Escondido River (Nicaragua)
 Nueces River in Texas, originally named Río Escondido

Other uses
 Escondido, a Latin dance from Argentina
 Escondido (band), an American indie folk band
 A Minute to Pray, a Second to Die (film)

See also
 El Escondido, a volcano in Colombia
 Puerto Escondido (disambiguation)
 Río Escondido (disambiguation)